The following is a list of lighthouses in the U.S. states of Illinois and Indiana. These two states are listed together as both have very few lighthouses that are confined to the Great Lakes.

Illinois

Indiana

Notable faux lighthouses:
 Cooper Memorial (1997), on the Prairie Creek Reservoir near Muncie, is an active light but does not meet the Directory's size standard for a lighthouse.
 Gloryland Lighthouse, near New Castle, is not on navigable water.

References

Illinois
Indiana
 
 
Lighthouses
Lighthouses